Nanne may refer to:

 Nanne (given name)
 Nanne (surname)